

Gustav-Adolf von Nostitz-Wallwitz (11 July 1898 – 31 May 1945) was a general in the Wehrmacht of Nazi Germany during World War II. He was a recipient of the Knight's Cross of the Iron Cross. Nostitz-Wallwitz was wounded in March 1945 in the Heiligenbeil Pocket, he was evacuated to a hospital in Eckernförde and died on 31 May 1945.

Awards and decorations

 German Cross in Gold on 1 December 1941 as Oberstleutnant in reitendes Artillerie-Regiment 1
 Knight's Cross of the Iron Cross on 12 June 1944 as Oberst and commander of Panzer-Artillerie-Regiment 89

References

Citations

Bibliography

 
 

1898 births
1945 deaths
People from Oschatz
People from the Kingdom of Saxony
Major generals of the German Army (Wehrmacht)
Military personnel from Saxony
German Army personnel of World War I
Reichswehr personnel
Recipients of the clasp to the Iron Cross, 1st class
Recipients of the Gold German Cross
Recipients of the Knight's Cross of the Iron Cross
German Army personnel killed in World War II
German Army generals of World War II